Pinda may refer to:

People
 Emmanuel Pinda (born 1961), French karate practitioner
 Kingsley Pinda (born 1992), French basketball player
 Mizengo Pinda (born 1948), Prime Minister of Tanzania

Other uses
 Pinda (riceball), rice balls offered to ancestors during Hindu funeral rites and ancestor worship
 Pinda-Boroko, a town in Bondoukou Department, Ivory Coast

See also
 Pindamonhangaba, a city in the state of São Paulo, Brazil (shortened).
 Pindar (disambiguation)
 Pindi (disambiguation)